James Bradshaw (born 20 March 1976) is an English actor, known for his roles as Gordon Grimley in the Granada series The Grimleys, D.S Geoff Thorpe in Hollyoaks and Dr. Max DeBryn in Endeavour.

Career
Bradshaw's television roles include parts in  Mile High, Primeval, Heartbeat, the 2000 film Longitude, and Noah Claypole in Alan Bleasdale's 1999 adaptation of Oliver Twist, which starred Robert Lindsay. Bradshaw has worked at the Birmingham Rep, Hampstead Theatre, and the Royal National Theatre in House/Garden, directed by Sir Alan Ayckbourn. In 2006, he played Polly Tompkins in The Line of Beauty. In 2009, he joined the cast of Breakfast at Tiffany's at the Theatre Royal, Haymarket.

Bradshaw's film roles include appearances in Minotaur and Irish Jam. In 2008 he appeared as Mr Samgrass in the film adaptation of Evelyn Waugh's Brideshead Revisited. In July 2011 he made a guest appearance as a surveyor in Coronation Street and as an environmental health inspector named Matthew Grindlay in EastEnders in November 2012. From November 2014 Bradshaw played the recurring role of DS Geoff Thorpe in Channel 4 soap opera Hollyoaks, until DS Thorpe was killed off in March 2018. 

Since 2012 he has performed the role of pathologist Dr. Max DeBryn in the ITV series Endeavour, the prequel series to Inspector Morse.

Filmography

Stage

Radio

References

External links

Living people
1976 births
English male film actors
English male television actors
People from Stamford, Lincolnshire
People from Rutland
Alumni of Birmingham School of Acting
English male stage actors